Chomelia is a genus of flowering plants in the family Rubiaceae. It is native to Mexico, Central America, the West Indies, and much of South America as far south as Argentina.

Species

Chomelia albicaulis (Rusby) Steyerm. - Bolivia
Chomelia anisomeris Müll.Arg. - eastern Brazil
Chomelia apodantha (Standl.) Steyerm. - Bolivia
Chomelia bahiae J.H.Kirkbr. - Bahia
Chomelia barbata Standl. - Mexico
Chomelia barbinervis Moric. ex Benth. - northern and southeastern Brazil
Chomelia bella (Standl.) Steyerm. - southeastern Brazil
Chomelia boliviana Standl. - Bolivia
Chomelia brachypoda Donn.Sm. - Mexico, Guatemala, Honduras
Chomelia brasiliana A.Rich. - Brazil
Chomelia breedlovei Borhidi - Chiapas
Chomelia brevicornu Rusby - Bolivia, Peru
Chomelia caurensis (Standl.) Steyerm. - Bolívar (state)
Chomelia chiquitensis C.M.Taylor - Santa Cruz
Chomelia costaricensis C.M.Taylor - Costa Rica
Chomelia crassifolia Borhidi - Oaxaca, Tabasco
Chomelia delascioi Steyerm. - Bolívar
Chomelia dimorpha Rusby - Bolivia
Chomelia ecuadorensis (K.Schum. & K.Krause) Steyerm. - Colombia, Ecuador
Chomelia estrellana Müll.Arg. - Rio de Janeiro
Chomelia fasciculata (Sw.) Sw. - western Cuba, Jamaica, Windward Islands
Chomelia glabricalyx Steyerm. - Bolívar
Chomelia glabriuscula Steyerm. - Venezuela, French Guiana
Chomelia gracilis K.Schum. ex Glaziou - southeastern Brazil
Chomelia grandicarpa Dwyer - Panama
Chomelia grandifolia (Huber) Steyerm. - northern and southeastern Brazil
Chomelia hirsuta Gardner - northern and southeastern Brazil
Chomelia intercedens Müll.Arg. - Brazil
Chomelia juruensis (Standl.) Steyerm. - northern Brazil
Chomelia kirkbridei Delprete - Federal District, Goias
Chomelia klugii (Standl.) Steyerm. - Colombia, Peru, northern Brazil
Chomelia laxiflora (Standl.) Govaerts - Colombia
Chomelia longiflora (Standl. ex Steyerm.) Steyerm. - Colombia
Chomelia longituba (Borhidi) Borhidi - Veracruz, Chiapas 
Chomelia malaneoides Müll.Arg. - Guyana, Venezuela, Bolivia, Colombia, Ecuador, Peru, Brazil
Chomelia microloba Donn.Sm. - Costa Rica, Panama, Colombia
Chomelia minutiflora Glaz. - Minas Gerais
Chomelia modesta (Standl.) Steyerm. - southeastern Sao Paulo
Chomelia monachinoi Steyerm. - Venezuela
Chomelia monantha (Standl. ex Steyerm.) Steyerm. - Rio de Janeiro
Chomelia multiflora Rusby - Bolivia, Guyana
Chomelia myrtifolia S.Moore - Mato Grosso
Chomelia obtusa Cham. & Schltdl. - Guyana, Venezuela, Brazil, Argentina, Paraguay, Uruguay
Chomelia occidentalis Müll.Arg. - west-central Brazil
Chomelia oligantha Müll.Arg. - eastern Brazil
Chomelia paniculata (Bartl. ex DC.) Steyerm. - Guyana, Venezuela, Colombia, Peru, Brazil
Chomelia parviflora (Müll.Arg.) Müll.Arg. - Brazil
Chomelia parvifolia (Standl.) Govaerts - Brazil
Chomelia pedunculosa Benth. - Brazil
Chomelia pohliana Müll.Arg. - Brazil, Paraguay
Chomelia polyantha S.F.Blake - Guyana, Venezuela, Colombia, Ecuador, Brazil
Chomelia pringlei S.Watson - San Luis Potosí
Chomelia psilocarpa Dwyer & M.V.Hayden - Panama, northwestern Colombia
Chomelia pubescens Cham. & Schltdl. - eastern Brazil
Chomelia ramiae Steyerm. - Apure
Chomelia randioides (Standl.) Steyerm. - Ceará
Chomelia rauwolfioides (Standl.) Steyerm. - Bolivia
Chomelia recordii Standl. - Costa Rica, Guatemala, Honduras, Nicaragua, Panama, Colombia
Chomelia ribesioides Benth. ex A.Gray - Bolivia, Brazil
Chomelia rubra Lorence & C.M.Taylor - Panama
Chomelia rudis (Standl.) Lorence - Honduras
Chomelia schomburgkii Steyerm. - Guyana
Chomelia sericea Müll.Arg. - Brazil
Chomelia sessilis Müll.Arg. - Brazil
Chomelia spinosa Jacq. - southern Mexico to tropical South America
Chomelia splitgerberi Bremek. - Guyana, Suriname
Chomelia stergiosii Steyerm. - Bolívar
Chomelia tenuiflora Benth. - Costa Rica to tropical South America
Chomelia torrana C.M.Taylor - Chocó
Chomelia transiens Müll.Arg. - Rio de Janeiro
Chomelia triantha Standl. - Boyacá
Chomelia triflora (J.H.Kirkbr.) Delprete & Achille - French Guiana
Chomelia tristis Müll.Arg. - Rio de Janeiro
Chomelia ulei (K.Krause) Achille & Delprete - Peru
Chomelia venezuelensis Steyerm. - Venezuela
Chomelia venulosa W.C.Burger & C.M.Taylor - Costa Rica, Panama
Chomelia volubilis (Standl.) Steyerm. - Amazonas
Chomelia vulpina Müll.Arg. - Rio de Janeiro

References

External links
Chomelia in the World Checklist of Rubiaceae

Rubiaceae genera
Guettardeae
Flora of Central America
Flora of South America
Flora of the Caribbean